Tommy Turner (born January 17, 1947) is an American former sprinter.  Running for Murray State, he won the 1971 NCAA Indoor Championships in the 600 yard run.

External links 
 Profile at trackfield.brinkster.net

1947 births
Living people
American male sprinters
Athletes (track and field) at the 1971 Pan American Games
Pan American Games gold medalists for the United States
Pan American Games medalists in athletics (track and field)
Murray State Racers athletes
Universiade medalists in athletics (track and field)
Universiade gold medalists for the United States
Medalists at the 1971 Pan American Games